Mali, a Belgian Malinois, is a military working dog.  In 2017, he was awarded the People's Dispensary for Sick Animals' Dickin Medal for bravery. As of 2018, he was the only surviving recipient of the Dickin medal.

See also
List of individual dogs

Notes

Individual dogs awarded the Dickin Medal
Special Boat Service personnel
British Army personnel of the War in Afghanistan (2001–2021)